The Canada Games are a strictly amateur multi-sport event held in Canada biannually, alternating between Summer and Winter editions. Athletes enter the Games representing each of their respective 13 provinces or territories. The first Games were held as part of Canada's Centennial Year Celebrations in 1967. Ontario and Quebec remain the only two provinces to win the Canada Winter Games thus far, with British Columbia and Alberta constantly secured in the third and fourth positions.

Host Cities

1 These provinces/territories have yet to choose the city.
2 Held across the entire province.

Total medals
As of the 2022 Canada Games

Canada Games Editions

1967 Canada Winter Games
The 1967 Canada Winter Games were held in Quebec City, Quebec. These were the first Canada Games held, and were part of the celebrations for Canada's Centennial Year.

1969 Canada Summer Games
The 1969 Canada Summer Games were held in Halifax/Dartmouth, Nova Scotia.

1971 Canada Winter Games
The 1971 Canada Winter Games were held in Saskatoon, Saskatchewan.

1973 Canada Summer Games
The 1973 Canada Summer Games were held in New Westminster/Burnaby, British Columbia

1975 Canada Winter Games

The 1975 Canada Winter Games were held in Lethbridge, Alberta

1977 Canada Summer Games
The 1977 Canada Summer Games were held in St. John's, Newfoundland and Labrador.

1979 Canada Winter Games
The 1979 Canada Winter Games were held in Brandon, Manitoba.

1981 Canada Summer Games
The 1981 Canada Summer Games were held in Thunder Bay, Ontario

1983 Canada Winter Games
The 1983 Canada Winter Games were held in Saguenay/Lac Saint-Jean, Quebec

1985 Canada Summer Games
The 1985 Canada Summer Games were held in Saint John, New Brunswick

1987 Canada Winter Games
The 1987 Canada Winter Games were held in Cape Breton County, Nova Scotia

1989 Canada Summer Games
The 1989 Canada Summer Games were held in Saskatoon, Saskatchewan

1991 Canada Winter Games
The 1991 Canada Winter Games were held in Charlottetown, Prince Edward Island

1993 Canada Summer Games
The 1993 Canada Summer Games were held in Kamloops, British Columbia

1995 Canada Winter Games
The 1995 Canada Winter Games were held in Grande Prairie, Alberta

1997 Canada Summer Games
The 1997 Canada Summer Games were held in Brandon, Manitoba

1999 Canada Winter Games
The 1999 Canada Winter Games were held in Corner Brook, Newfoundland and Labrador

2001 Canada Summer Games
The 2001 Canada Summer Games were held in London, Ontario

ordered by total medals, ranked by medal type

2003 Canada Winter Games

The 2003 Canada Winter Games were held in Bathurst/Campbellton, New Brunswick

ordered by total medals, ranked by medal type

2005 Canada Summer Games

The 2005 Canada Summer Games were held in Regina, Saskatchewan

Standings

Sports

    Athletics
    Baseball
    Basketball
    Canoeing
    Cycling
    Diving
    Field Hockey
    Rowing
    Rugby union
    Sailing
    Soccer
     Women's Soccer
     Men's Soccer
    Softball
     Women's Softball
     Men's Softball
    Swimming
    Tennis
    Volleyball
    Wrestling

2007 Canada Winter Games

The 2007 Canada Winter Games were held in Whitehorse, Yukon.
These were the first Canada Games held North of 60 (in the polar regions). The games were held concurrent with the Inuit Games and Dene Games.

Standings

Sports

    Alpine skiing
    Archery
    Artistic gymnastics
    Badminton
    Biathlon
    Boxing
    Cross country skiing
    Curling
    Fencing
    Figure skating
    Freestyle skiing
    Judo
    Ice hockey
    Ringette
    Shooting
    Speed skating
    Squash
    Synchronized swimming
    Table tennis
    Wheelchair basketball

 Snowboarding (Demonstrating sport)

2009 Canada Summer Games

The 2009 Canada Summer Games were held in many communities in Prince Edward Island

Standings

Sports

   Athletics
   Baseball
   Basketball
   Canoe/Kayak
   Cycling
   Diving
   Golf
   Rowing
   Rugby
   Sailing
   Soccer
   Softball
   Swimming
   Tennis
   Triathlon
   Beach Volleyball
   Volleyball
   Wrestling

2011 Canada Winter Games

The 2011 Canada Winter Games were held in Halifax, Nova Scotia

Standings

Sports

    Alpine skiing
    Archery
    Artistic gymnastics
    Badminton
    Biathlon
    Boxing 
    Cross-country skiing
    Curling
    Figure skating
    Freestyle skiing
    Ice hockey
    Judo
    Ringette
    Shooting
    Short track speed skating
    Snowboarding
    Squash
    Speed skating
    Synchronized swimming
    Table tennis
    Wheelchair basketball

2013 Canada Summer Games

The 2013 Canada Summer Games were held in Sherbrooke, Quebec

Standings

Sports

    Aquatics
        Diving
        Swimming
    Athletics
    Baseball
    Basketball
    Canoeing
        Canoe sprint
    Cycling
        Mountain biking
        Road
    Fencing
    Golf
    Rowing
    Sailing
    Soccer
    Softball
    Tennis
    Triathlon
    Volleyball
        Volleyball
        Beach volleyball
    Wrestling
        Freestyle

2015 Canada Winter Games

The 2015 Canada Winter Games were held in Prince George, British Columbia

Standings

Sports

    Alpine skiing
    Archery
    Badminton
    Biathlon
    Cross-country skiing
    Curling
    Figure skating
    Freestyle skiing
    Gymnastics
        Artistic gymnastics 
        Trampoline 
    Ice hockey
    Judo
    Ringette
    Shooting
    Short track speed skating
    Speed skating
    Snowboarding
    Squash
    Synchronized swimming
    Table tennis
    Wheelchair Basketball

2017 Canada Summer Games

The 2017 Canada Summer Games were held in Winnipeg, Manitoba

Medal Standings

2019 Canada Winter Games

The 2019 Canada Winter Games were held in Red Deer, Alberta

2022 Canada Summer Games

The 2022 Canada Summer Games were held in Niagara Region, Ontario

See also

Canada sport-related lists